Viktor Salmhofer (born 24 July 1909; date of death unknown) was an Austrian sprint canoeist who competed in the late 1940s. At the 1948 Summer Olympics in London, he finished fourth in the C-2 10000 m event and fifth in the C-2 1000 m event.

References

Viktor Salmhofer's profile at Sports Reference.com

1909 births
Austrian male canoeists
Canoeists at the 1948 Summer Olympics
Olympic canoeists of Austria
Year of death missing